The 2022–23 Italian football winter transfer window runs from 2 to 31 January 2023. This list includes transfers featuring at least one club from either Serie A or Serie B that were completed after the end of the summer 2022 transfer window on 30 September 2022 and before the end of the winter 2022–23 window on 31 January.

Transfers
All players and clubs without a flag are Italian.

Legend
Those clubs in Italic indicate that the player already left the team on loan on this or the previous season or a new signing that immediately left the club.

Footnotes

References

2022–23 in Italian football
Italy
2022